Mission Control Space Services is a Canadian space technology company located in Ottawa, Ontario. The company was founded in 2015, and has since operated out of the Carleton Led Accelerator at Carleton University. Primarily, Mission Control Space Services focuses on technology development, industry consulting, and education and outreach projects.

About
In 2015, the company won its first contract with the Canadian Space Agency to develop ASAS: the Autonomous Soil Assessment System.
ASAS eventually will be used to detect unknown hazards such as soft soil that could immobilize a planetary rover (much like what happened to NASA's Spirit Rover). Operating in real time, the technology aims to increase the navigation autonomy of rovers in challenging terrain and improve their speed. ASAS is being developed in collaboration with key partners both from academia and industry, including Concordia’s Institute of Aerospace Design and Innovation, Dr. Krzysztof Skonieczny; Dr. Karl Iagnemma; and two Canadian companies, Ontario Drive and Gear and Canadensys Aerospace Corp.

In 2018 and again in 2019, the company secured funding from the Canadian Space Agency for development of an operations and autonomy framework for upcoming commercial lunar exploration missions.  Software from Mission Control Space Services will help guide the Rashid Lunar Rover, a component of the Emirates Lunar Mission, scheduled to launch on a SpaceX Falcon 9 rocket in 2022.

References

Aerospace companies of Canada
Companies based in Ottawa
Canadian companies established in 2015
2015 establishments in Ontario